Thalanadu is a Southern Indian village, situated in the eastern part of Kottayam district in Kerala, between Vagamon, Moonnilavu and Teekoy

Geography 
Thalanadu is a typical Kerala village, which is a mixture of the features of both midland countryside and  the Malanad hill area, enveloped in greenery with a clean and unpolluted atmosphere.  It is a small panchayat in Poonjar Vadakkekara Village, but quite long, stretching about 25 kilometres including Adukkom reaching up to the Vagamon and Munnilavu Panjayahthu area, at about three thousand and five hundred feet above sea level.  This place is known for its agriculture and landscape. It is full of hills and valleys in the middle of which flows the Meenachil river (made famous by Arundhati Roy's novel, The God of Small Things).

People 
Large scale settlement in Thalanadu began more than 85 to 90 years ago. It has resemblance to a tropical rain-forest area with all kinds of trees like teak, jackfruit, etc., found in the Western Ghats region growing profusely besides coconut, latex rubber, arecanut and other crops.  It is a very fertile area. Here most of the people are farmers and they cultivate rubber, elachi, ginger, cardamom, clove, nutmeg, turmeric, pepper, cashew and other spices. Considerable variety of medicinal plants also grow here which have been used in making the traditional home remedies. Most of the people are Christians, Muslims and Hindus. The literacy rate in this village is above 90% with very less unemployment recorded. There is a voluntary job training institute named TIES established in 90's is the best example for the peoples dedications towards the development of the village. This institute provided free training for thousands of young people there to get a job in the Government public sector. Their fraternity within people makes this place graceful.

Culture
Thalanadu is a rural village with a hilly touch. It  has a dominant rural culture, People join together for celebrating the annual festivals, rituals and feasts in church and temples etc.  Women are not just housewives. They  too join public life especially after the restructured Panchayati raj system was introduced. There is only a moderate level of political activity, hence hardly any social divisions over politics. There are three Temples, one church and two Mosques in this place.

Climate
Thalanadu climate has a heavy rainy season and mild summer. Summer rains are not infrequent. With hills in the backdrop it never gets very hot, and the climate tends towards windy and cool. This weather makes the soil good for all crops.

Tourism
Thalanadu is naturally perched by its location in one of the busiest tourist circuits in Kerala.Ayyampara has a huge rock formation whose top is a flat expanse running into hundreds of acres. It is a place with many cliffs, a cave and panoramic views. People also visit this place in the evening to enjoy the cool breeze and see the sun set. Ayyampara is one of the main tourist destination in this place with big rock mountain three thousand and five hundred feet from the Sea level. Rolling hills and hillocks dot Thalanadu in abundance but some places are very steep. Many tourists come to experience the  beauty of raining and Greenishness on the way to vagamon. Both the river and the flat land are flanked by hills. Plantations such as Rubber and other cultivations showing the developments of this area. The origin of meenachil river is starts from here.

Picnickers often come to Illikkan Mala, Adukkom another place in this . One is the Marmala waterfall in the Meenachil river where water cascades down from the hill over a rocky slope.  
The nearby Illickan mountain rises steeply to a height of more than three thousand feet, from its top with views extending up to 75 kilometres to the Alleppey port on a clear night. In the season tourists camp on its top. There is only one entry and exit point to the top. Legend has it that its rocky top is believed to have a mythical pond where the Neelakoduveli grows, a wonder plant that assures you perennial prosperity if you can collect its leaves when they flow down through the river Meenachil once a year.

Notable People 
Jeo Baby

Madappattu Gopala Pillai

References

 1. Kaiyyoppu

2. The Mentor of Thalanadu 

Villages in Kottayam district